Kafr Laha is a town in the Homs Governorate north of Homs in northern Syria. In 2004 it had a population of 20,041 according to the Central Bureau of Statistics of Syria. Its inhabitants are predominantly Sunni Muslims. It is the largest town in the Houla region. Nearby localities include Tallaf to the northeast, Tell Dahab to the north, Aqrab to the northwest, Qarmas and Maryamin to the west, al-Taybah al-Gharbiyah to the southwest and Taldou to the southeast.

History
Kafr Laha has been identified as the ancient Aramaean settlement of Byt'l also known as "Bethel".

Kafr Laha has been the site of demonstrations against the Assad government during the ongoing Syrian uprising which began in 2011.

References

Bibliography

Populated places in Homs District